The chemical compound ethyl nitrite is an alkyl nitrite with a chemical formula C2H5NO2. It may be prepared from ethanol.

Uses 
It is used as a reagent with butanone to yield the dimethylglyoxime end product.

Ethyl nitrite is the main ingredient in a traditional ethanol-based South African remedy for colds and flu known as Witdulsies, which is sold in pharmacies. It is known as a traditional Afrikaans remedy; the same remedy is apparently made by the Amish in the US. However, FDA has blocked over-the-counter sales of this same remedy, known in the US as sweet nitrite or sweet spirit of nitre, since 1980. Its use has been associated with fatal methemoglobinemia.

Methemoglobinemia is the primary toxic effect of ethyl nitrite. Due to ethyl nitrite's high volatility and faint smell, in the  presence of ethyl nitrite vapors, it is easy to breath a high dose of it without realizing, resulting in methemoglobinemia, which may or may not be severe, or even fatal.

References

External links
 WebBook page for ethyl nitrite

Antianginals
Antidotes
Ethyl esters
Alkyl nitrites
Traditional medicine